Qazan Qayeh (also Romanized as Qāzān Qāyeh and Qāzān Qayeh; also known as Qāzān Qīleh) is a village in Maraveh Tappeh Rural District, in the Central District of Maraveh Tappeh County, Golestan Province, Iran. At the 2006 census, its population was 1,610, in 335 families.

References 

Populated places in Maraveh Tappeh County